Cheyenne Trails is a 1928 American silent Western film directed by Robert J. Horner and starring Ted Wells,   Bud Osborne and William Barrymore.

Cast
 Ted Wells 
 Bud Osborne
 Ione Reed 
 William Barrymore
 Bill Nestell

References

External links
 

1928 films
1928 Western (genre) films
American black-and-white films
Films directed by Robert J. Horner
Silent American Western (genre) films
1920s English-language films
1920s American films